Group C of the 2018 FIFA World Cup took place from 16 to 26 June 2018. The group consisted of France, Australia, Peru and Denmark. The top two teams, France and Denmark, advanced to the round of 16. France would go on to win the tournament.

France, Denmark and Australia were drawn in the same group again for the 2022 FIFA World Cup.

Teams

Notes

Standings

In the round of 16:
The winners of Group C, France, advanced to play the runners-up of Group D, Argentina.
The runners-up of Group C, Denmark, advanced to play the winners of Group D, Croatia.

Matches
All times listed are local time.

France vs Australia
The two teams had met in four previous matches, most recently in a 2013 friendly, a 6–0 France victory.

After a disjointed first half, the game sparked into life shortly after the interval as referee Andrés Cunha initially disallowed a French penalty, but after a call from the VAR, changed his decision and awarded the penalty to France,  deciding that Josh Risdon had clipped Antoine Griezmann just inside the area. Griezmann would convert the penalty, which was the first World Cup penalty awarded by VAR. The opener was soon cancelled out just four minutes later by another penalty, Australian midfielder and captain, Mile Jedinak, slotting home after Samuel Umtiti handled the ball in the box, and they looked on course to hold one of the pre-tournament favourites until Paul Pogba's lobbed effort confirmed by goal line technology deflected off Australia full-back Aziz Behich and the crossbar to fall inches over the goal-line.

The two penalties were scored in the game between France and Australia were only four minutes, seven seconds apart - the shortest period of time between two penalties being scored by different sides in a World Cup match. Both countries also featured their youngest ever World Cup players in Daniel Arzani at 19 years and 163 days and Kylian Mbappé at 19 years and 178 days.

Peru vs Denmark
The two teams had never met before in a FIFA-sanctioned match, but both teams previously faced each other in an exhibition match at the 1997 U.S. Cup (a 2–1 Denmark victory).

Yoshimar Yotún lashed the ball into Kasper Schmeichel's midriff from 25 yards as Peru began the game and Edison Flores lifted a shot over the crossbar from just outside the box. André Carrillo surged towards the Denmark box in the 13th minute and cut inside to curl a low drive towards the bottom-left corner, only for Schmeichel to pull off a diving save. Denmark began to dominate possession but it was not until the 27th minute that they attempted a shot on goal, Thomas Delaney launching the ball over. Denmark midfielder William Kvist was taken off on a stretcher after a sustaining a blow to the ribs in a challenge with Jefferson Farfán, and then Christian Cueva was brought down in the penalty area by Yussuf Poulsen. The referee pointed to the spot upon reviewing video footage and Cueva blazed over, much to the dismay of Peru's sizable travelling support. Adopting a more adventurous approach after the restart, Denmark were rewarded when Christian Eriksen's precise through-ball allowed Poulsen to open the scoring with a low left foot shot. Peru were denied an immediate equaliser when Denmark goalkeeper Schmeichel produced a one-handed save to deny Flores. Substitute Paolo Guerrero, who was only able to play after a Swiss tribunal lifted a 14-month drugs ban, backheeled a chance wide as Denmark held on.

Denmark have won three of their four World Cup matches against South American opponents, with the only exception being a 3–2 defeat against Brazil in the 1998 quarter-final.

Denmark vs Australia
The two teams had met in three previous matches, most recently in a friendly in 2012, with Denmark prevailing 2–0.

Thomas Delaney headed wide from Pione Sisto's cross after just two minutes against Australia. At the other end, Mathew Leckie rose above the Danish defence to head a corner over the bar but Denmark countered and Nicolai Jørgensen's lay-off afforded Christian Eriksen the chance to hit a half-volley past Mathew Ryan and into the top left corner of the net. Sisto shot a 20-yard drive and Jørgensen flashed a close-range header just wide. In the 35th minute, referee consulted VAR and decided that Yussuf Poulsen used his arm to block Leckie's headed shot and awarded the penalty, which Mile Jedinak shot into the bottom right corner of the net. Poulsen had a penalty claim of his own waved away early in the second half after he tumbled to the ground on his way into the Australia box. Kasper Schmeichel failed to collect a looping long ball before Leckie flashed the ball across the face of goal. Daniel Arzani teed up Aaron Mooy for a shot that flew just over the top right corner of Schmeichel's goal from outside the box. Andrew Nabbout left the field with a dislocated shoulder and was replaced by Tomi Juric.

After Ghana, Australia are the second team in World Cup history to score three consecutive goals from the penalty spot. Poulsen is the first player to concede two penalties in a single World Cup since Milan Dudić for Serbia in 2006. Mark Milligan completed 85 passes in this match - a record for an Australian player in a single game at a World Cup tournament. As Poulsen had a yellow card in the previous match, he did not play for Denmark in the next match.

France vs Peru
The two teams had met only once, a friendly game in 1982, won by Peru 1–0.

Yoshimar Yotún's shot from the halfway line drifted wide. Raphaël Varane missed with a header before Pedro Gallese saved with his legs to deny Antoine Griezmann after Olivier Giroud found him with a headed pass. Paolo Guerrero shot straight at Hugo Lloris on the turn after Christian Cueva found him in the box. Paul Pogba slid Giroud into the area and when his shot looped over Gallese via a deflection off Christian Ramos, Kylian Mbappé tapped into the empty net from inside the six-yard box. Pedro Aquino clipped the outside of the post with a drive from 25 yards. André Carrillo fired over the crossbar and Jefferson Farfán hit the side-netting. Guerrero missed a late free-kick, and France secured their place in the knockout stages, while Peru were knocked out.

Mbappe became France's youngest ever goalscorer at the World Cup, aged 19 years and 183 days. Mbappe became the first player born after France's 1998 World Cup triumph to score a goal at the finals. Peru are just the second South American side to fail to qualify for the World Cup knockout stages in the last three tournaments - the other being Ecuador in 2014.

Denmark vs France

The two teams had faced each other in 15 matches, including two World Cup group stage matches, in 1998, won by France 2–1, and in 2002, won by Denmark 2–0.

Olivier Giroud and Raphaël Varane sent early efforts off target. In the 38th minute a strike from Antoine Griezmann was straight at Kasper Schmeichel. Steve Mandanda spilled a long-range Christian Eriksen free-kick before recovering to claim the loose ball ahead of lurking striker Andreas Cornelius. Eriksen shot wide in the 59th minute, although France substitute Nabil Fekir shot at the side-netting with a drive shortly after his introduction for Griezmann. Fekir forced a stop from Schmeichel in the 82nd minute, while Giroud had a late penalty appeal rejected by the referee.

This was the only goalless draw of the 2018 World Cup; there were 36 matches played prior to this one, beating the previous record number of matches without a goalless draw to start a World Cup finals, set in 1954, when all 26 matches saw at least one goal.

Australia vs Peru

The two teams had never met before.

Mile Jedinak was booked for a high boot on Christian Cueva after nine minutes of the first half. At the 18th minute, Paolo Guerrero broke into the penalty area, cut back onto his right foot and swung a deep cross for André Carrillo to lash a volley through Jedinak's legs and into the bottom right corner of the net. Tom Rogic beat three defenders on a run into the penalty area after 26 minutes and saw his shot saved by Pedro Gallese, before Mathew Leckie was denied by an Anderson Santamaría tackle as he slid in on goal. Five minutes into the second half, Guerrero hooked the ball into the far corner of the net beyond Mathew Ryan's left hand. Jedinak's far-post header was saved by Gallese and Trent Sainsbury shot wide from close range, while substitute Tim Cahill had a volley blocked inside the penalty area. Edison Flores crashed a low drive onto the post from the edge of the box in the closing minutes, but the offside flag was raised.

Carrillo became the first Peru player to score at a World Cup in 36 years. He ended a barren run of 205 minutes since Guillermo La Rosa struck in a 5–1 loss to Poland during Spain 1982. Peru won their first match at the World Cup since a 4–1 win over Iran in 1978. Guerrero - aged 34 years and 176 days - became the third oldest South American scorer at the World Cup, behind only Argentina's Martín Palermo (36 years, 227 days) and Obdulio Varela of Uruguay (36 years 279 days). Cahill became the first Australian to appear at four different World Cup finals. For Australia, they had not won any World Cup matches since their last major victory in 2010 FIFA World Cup, beating Serbia 2–1; and also Australia had not defeated any South American team in the FIFA World Cup, having been beaten by Brazil 0–2 in 2006, drew 0–0 and lost 1–3 to Chile in 1974 and 2014.

Discipline
Fair play points would have been used as tiebreakers if the overall and head-to-head records of teams were tied. These were calculated based on yellow and red cards received in all group matches as follows:
first yellow card: minus 1 point;
indirect red card (second yellow card): minus 3 points;
direct red card: minus 4 points;
yellow card and direct red card: minus 5 points;

Only one of the above deductions were applied to a player in a single match.

References

External links

 2018 FIFA World Cup Group C, FIFA.com

2018 FIFA World Cup
France at the 2018 FIFA World Cup
Australia at the 2018 FIFA World Cup
Peru at the 2018 FIFA World Cup
Denmark at the 2018 FIFA World Cup